Prosopocoilus tragulus is a species of beetles of the family Lucanidae.

Description 

Distribution 
This species occurs in Indonesia and New Guinea.

References 

 Biolib

tragulus
Beetles described in 1861
Insects of Indonesia
Taxa named by Samuel Constantinus Snellen van Vollenhoven